"Lucy Goes to the Hospital" is an episode of the 1950s American television show I Love Lucy in which the title character, Lucy Ricardo, gives birth to a baby boy after a chaotic sequence of events. Twelve hours before the original broadcast on January 19, 1953, the actress who played Lucy, Lucille Ball, had given birth to Desi Arnaz, Jr. by cesarean section. The episode had actually been filmed on November 14, 1952.

The episode was the culmination of an unprecedented pairing of the fictional pregnancy of Lucy with the real-life pregnancy of Ball; "real-time pregnancy was fictively narrated for the first time on American television." (This may not entirely be true, since Mary Kay and Johnny is also reputed to have written the pregnancy of its star Mary Kay Stearns into the script; that more obscure series has since been mostly destroyed, making it difficult to verify.)

When the episode premiered on January 19, 1953, 73.9% of all American homes with television sets tuned in, amounting to 44 million viewers watching the episode, a record until September 9, 1956, when Elvis Presley appeared for the first time on The Ed Sullivan Show, at CBS, which drew a share of 82.6%, a figure unrivaled since. It received higher ratings than the inauguration of President Dwight D. Eisenhower, which received 29 million viewers, the day afterward. According to the Indian newspaper The Telegraph, scripts for the episode were reviewed by a rabbi, a minister, and a priest in order to make sure it would not be offensive.

The cover story of Newsweek on January 19, 1953 was about the episode (which had not yet been aired when the issue went to press). The first issue of TV Guide, dated April 3, 1953, featured a cover photo of newborn Desi Arnaz, Jr., captioned as "Lucy's $50,000,000 Baby".

Numerous stories were published about the sex of the baby, which was kept secret until the episode aired; when Ball actually had a boy as Lucy did in the script, headlines proclaimed "Lucy sticks to script: a boy it is!" (New York Daily Mirror), "TV was right: a boy for Lucille" (New York Daily News), and "What the Script Ordered" (Life magazine).

See also
Pregnancy in I Love Lucy

References

External links

1953 American television episodes
I Love Lucy episodes